"Diggin' Up Bones" is a song written by Paul Overstreet, Al Gore, and Nat Stuckey, and recorded by American country music artist Randy Travis.  It was released in August 1986 as the third single from his album Storms of Life.  It peaked at number-one in both the United States and Canada.

Content
The song is a mid-tempo ballad, in which the male narrator yearns for "a love that's dead and gone", whose items he kept and pulled out of storage.

Other versions

 Mel Tillis - on his album California Road (1985)

Charts

Certifications

References

1986 singles
1986 songs
Randy Travis songs
Song recordings produced by Kyle Lehning
Songs written by Nat Stuckey
Songs written by Paul Overstreet
Warner Records singles